Bharath B. J. is an Indian music producer, composer and singer, who works predominantly in Kannada cinema. Starting his career as a composer for the short film Simply Kailawesome in 2010, Bharath got his breakthrough in 2013 with the film Simple Agi Ondh Love Story. His greatest advancement came through the film Beautiful Manasugalu (2017) for which he won the Filmfare Award for Best Music Director. Apart from composing music, Bharath has recorded his voice for songs, notably the "Hey Who Are You" song from the film Kirik Party (2016).

Career
Bharath B. J., hailing from Bengaluru, was singing non-film light songs. Eventually he picked up the music programming and producing skills and started a studio of his own. His first work was for the short film Simply Kailawesome starring MG Srinivas and directed by MG Srinivas which was promoted well prior to its release. In 2013, Bharath bagged the project Simple Agi Ondh Love Story which turned out to be a huge success upon its release; debutant director Suni, actors Rakshit Shetty and Shwetha Srivatsav along with Bharath; garnered huge popularity through the film. It was followed by another successful soundtrack for the film Bahuparak (2014) which was also directed by Suni. In 2016, he was signed in to compose for the sequel film Simple Agi Innond Love Story. Apart from this, he recorded his voice for the song "Hey Who Are You" for the successful film Kirik Party (2016), which had music composition by B. Ajaneesh Loknath.

In 2018, Bharath was adjudged the Best Music Director at the Filmfare Awards South for the director Jayatheertha's successful film Beautiful Manasugalu (2017).

Discography

Awards and nominations 
Filmfare Awards South

 2017: Best Music Director: Beautiful Manasugalu

References

External links
 
 

Living people
Kannada film score composers
Filmfare Awards South winners
1986 births
Film musicians from Karnataka
21st-century Indian composers
Indian male film score composers
21st-century male musicians